The Wife of Monte Cristo is a 1946 American adventure film directed by Edgar G. Ulmer and starring John Loder and Lenore Aubert.

It was successful at the box office.

Plot 
Edmund Dantes, The Count of Monte Cristo, returns in 1832, now accompanied by his wife, Countess Haydee. Dantes is seeking revenge against those responsible for his imprisonment, and justice for the Parisians being mistreated by the Prefect of Police. Wearing a mask and going by The Avenger", Dantes finds himself fighting with the Gendarmerie, getting wounded, and having Haydee wear the mask in his stead and take his place as "The Avenger".

Cast
 John Loder as De Villefort, Prefect of Police
 Lenore Aubert as Countess of Monte Cristo Haydée
 Fritz Kortner as Maillard
 Charles Dingle as Danglars
 Eduardo Ciannelli as Jacques Antoine
 Martin Kosleck as Edmund Dantes, Count of Monte Cristo
 Fritz Feld as Bonnett
 Eva Gabor as Mme. Lucille Maillard
 Clancy Cooper as Baptiste
 John Bleifer as Louis
 Egon Brecher as Proprietor
 Anthony Warde as Captain Benoit
 Colin Campbell as Abbe Faria

References

External links
 
 
 

1946 films
1940s historical adventure films
American black-and-white films
American historical adventure films
Films directed by Edgar G. Ulmer
Producers Releasing Corporation films
Films based on The Count of Monte Cristo
Films scored by Paul Dessau
1940s English-language films
1940s American films